Schlins is a municipality in the district of Feldkirch in the Austrian state of Vorarlberg.

Population

References

Bregenz Forest Mountains
Cities and towns in Feldkirch District